Sami Mavinga (born 25 March 1993) is a French rugby union player for Perpignan in France’s Top 14, the top tier. Mavinga is a prop and has previously played for Lyon OU and Stade Francais in France's Pro D2 and Top 14. He has also represented Newcastle Falcons in England’s Premiership Rugby.

Career
Mavinga joined LOU as a 13 year old and played for them in Pro D2 as well as the European Rugby Challenge Cup. On 27 March 2017, Mavinga's signing was announced by Newcastle Falcons in England. After two impressive seasons in England, Mavinga returned to France signing a contract with Stade Français in Paris.

References

French rugby union players
1993 births
Living people
Newcastle Falcons players
Lyon OU players
Rugby union props
French expatriates in England